A Far Cry is a Boston-based chamber orchestra. The orchestra is self-conducted and consists of 18 musicians called "The Criers". It was founded in 2007 by a group of 17 musicians in Boston.  The orchestra rehearses in Jamaica Plain and has been the Chamber Orchestra in Residence at the Isabella Stewart Gardner Museum since 2009. A Far Cry has toured across America and undertook their first European tour in 2012. They also collaborate with local students in an educational partnership with the New England Conservatory. The orchestra has released nine albums, two of which have been nominated for Grammy Awards for Best Chamber Music / Small Ensemble Performance: Dreams & Prayers in 2015 and Visions and Variations in 2019.

The Criers
Sharon Cohen, one of the orchestra's founding members, is an Israeli violinist with the Israel Philharmonic Orchestra in Tel Aviv.  She has a Masters of Music degree from the New England Conservatory.

Sarah Darling, is a violist and baroque violinist from Boston.  She received her B.A. from Harvard College, spent a year at the Juilliard School and the Conservatorium van Amsterdam, and completed an Artist Diploma at the Hochschule fur Musik Freiburg as a recipient of the Beebe, Paine, and DAAD grants for study abroad.  As of 2013, she is a doctoral student at the New England Conservatory with Kim Kashkashian.

Omar Guey is a violinist from Brazil.  He received a doctorate from Stony Brook University where he studied with Philip Setzer, Ani Kavafian, and Pamela Frank.  He received his master's degree from the Juilliard School under Robert Mann, and a bachelor's degree  from Manhattan School of Music under Sylvia Rosenberg.

Miki-Sophia Cloud is a violinist who studied at Harvard College, Vienna Music University, Yale School of Music, and the Perlman Music Program.  As of 2013, she is a doctoral student at the New England Conservatory.

Michael Unterman is a cellist in the master's degree program at the New England Conservatory.  He has studied at the New England Conservatory for four years, and in Barcelona, Spain for one year.

Megumi Stohs Lewis is a violinist from Portland, Oregon.  Her teachers include Camilla Wicks, Ian Swensen, Lucy Chapman, Roger Tapping, and Phoebe Carrai.

Loewi Lin, one of the orchestra's founding members, is a Taiwanese-Canadian cellist.  He attended the Cleveland Institute of Music, the University of Ottawa, and New England Conservatory.

Liesl Schoenberger is a violinist and with bachelor's and master's degrees from Indiana University where she studied under Mimi Zweig and Mauricio Fuks and an Artist Diploma from Yale University where she studied under Ani Kavafian. As of 2013, she is a doctoral student at the New England Conservatory and teaching assistant to Lucy Chapman.

Karl Doty is a bassist from Duluth, Minnesota.  He received his bachelor's and master's degrees from the New England Conservatory.

Jesse Irons is a violinist from Berlin, Vermont.  He received his undergraduate and graduate degrees from Peabody Conservatory.

Jason Fisher is a violist who grew up in Seattle.  He received his bachelor's degree from Peabody Conservatory studying under Victoria Chiang and his master's degree from Longy School of Music studying under Roger Tapping.

Jae Young Cosmos Lee is a violinist from Korea.  Lee holds degrees from the University of Michigan, the Cleveland Institute of Music, and the New England Conservatory.

Frank Shaw  is a violist and a member of A Far Cry since 2007.  He graduated from Interlochen Arts Academy, Cleveland Institute of Music and New England Conservatory.

Erik Higgins is a bassist who graduated from Indiana University and moved to Munich for a two-year apprenticeship with the Bavarian Radio Symphony Orchestra.

Courtenay Vandiver is a cellist who received her bachelor's degree from the New England Conservatory with Laurence Lesser, and her master's degree with Paul Katz.

Ashley Vandiver is a violinist who received her bachelor's degree from the New England Conservatory and master's degree from the Royal Conservatory in the Netherlands.  Her teachers include Vera Beths, James Buswell, Kennith Goldsmith and Laura Bossert.

Annie Rabbat is a violinist from Chicago who received her bachelor's degree from Indiana University and her master's degree from the Juilliard School.  After a year at Stony Brook University, she went to the New England Conservatory.  Her teachers include Miriam Fried, Robert Mann, Pamela Frank, Ani Kavafian, and Phil Setzer.

Alex Fortes is a violinist from San Diego and received degrees from Harvard College and Mannes College. His teachers include Mark Steinberg, Peter Zazofsky, Hernan Constantino, Mary Gerard, and Michael Gaisler.

Organization 
The Criers take turns leading the ensemble, and are in no particular hierarchy.  All members are simultaneously leaders and followers of the group.  All members take turns being section leaders during rehearsal.  The age range of the group is young, from 25-36 with varying backgrounds.  With the exception of the cellists, all players stand while performing.  The group's goal is "to wrestle the music they love back from the cultural baggage it's accumulated."  They have been labelled "post-classical" music by being part of Judd Greenstein's Ecstatic Music Festival.

Programs 
Their programs include music from various times periods, such as J.S. Bach, Heinrich Ignaz Franz Biber, Mozart, Elgar, Tchaikovsky, Bartók, Astor Piazzolla, Arvo Pärt, Steve Reich, and Osvaldo Golijov.  In 2013, The New York Times described their playing as a "mixing solemn with snappy."

Their works are usually a combination of older works with new works.  As part of the resident ensemble of the Isabella Gardner Museum, they played a seven-concert series called the Avant Gardner series.  This program focused on forward momentum and repeating patterns in music, with modern composers Andrew Norman, Christopher Theofanidis, Louis Andriessen, and the Baroque composer, Bach.

Performances and tours 
A Far Cry has played with cellist Yo-Yo Ma, and toured across America and their debut tour in 2012 in Europe.  They have also played from venues such as Calderwood Hall at the Gardner Museum, to Royale, a nightclub in Boston.  They are currently on their seventh season.

Discography 
 A Far Cry: Debut (2009)
 Copland; Aldridge: Clarinet Concertos (2010)
 Piazzolla (2011)
 TRACER (2013)
 The Mozart Sessions (2012)
 The Law of Mosaics (2014)
 Dreams & Prayers (2014)
 Circles: Piano Concertos by Bach & Glass 
 Visions and Variations (2018)

References

External links 
 

American classical music groups
Musical groups from Boston
Musical groups established in 2007
Chamber orchestras
2007 establishments in Massachusetts